Manijeh Hekmat (born 23 March 1962 in Arak) is an Iranian film director. She has worked since 1980 as an assistant director and production designer in over 25 films. She directed her first feature film Women's Prison (Zendān-e Zanān) in 2002. This film has been shown at over 80 international film festivals and has received seven prizes. Three Women (Seh Zan) is Hekmat's second feature film made in 2007. Hekmat has produced five noted films which include the award-winning feature films The Girl in the Sneakers and A Bunch of Grass, the latter a German-produced film made in the Iranian Kurdistan.
In her 2018 movie, The Old Road, Hekmat addressed the social problem of violence against women.

Hekmat is married to the film director Jamshid Āhangarāni. Their daughter, Pegāh Āhangarāni, is a film actress.

Filmography 
 2002: Women's Prison (Zendān-e Zanān): Writer, director, producer
 2004: The Wall: Director
 2008: Three Women (Seh Zan): Director, producer
 2009: Sedaha: Producer
 2010: Poopak and Mash Mashallah (Poopak va Mash Mashallah): Producer
 2011: No Men Allowed: Executive producer
 2020: There Are Things You Don't Know (Chiz-haie hast keh nemidani): Producer
 2014: City of Mice 2 (Shahr-e Mushha 2): Producer
 2015: The Gap: Producer
 2018: The Old Road: Director, producer
 2020: Bandar Band: Director, producer

References

External links
 Some photographs of Ms Manijeh Hekmat at Getty Images: . 
 Manijeh Hekmat at IMDb.
 Manijeh Hekmat, Dubai International Film Festival, .
 Alissa Simon, Manijeh Hekmat and Women's Prison, Senses of Cinema, October 2002, .
 Women's Prison: a film by Manijeh Hekmat - Iran, 2002 (106 minutes), The Global Film Initiative, .
 Sinā Saa'di, Prisoner and Prison Officer both Victims (Zendāni va Zendānbān har do Ghorbāni), in Persian, BBC Persian, 7 September 2002, .
 Alissa Simon, Three Women - Seh Zan (Iran), Variety, Festival Reviews, Wednesday, February 20, 2008, . 
 3 Women - Se Zan, Afi Fest, October 30 - November 9, 2008, .

Iranian women film directors
Iranian film directors
Iranian women's rights activists
Living people
1962 births
Members of the National Council for Peace
Women production designers
Iranian production designers